Maheswarpur (also spelled Moisapur) is a small village in Chinsurah subdivision of Hooghly district in the Indian state of West Bengal). It is on the crossing of National Highway 2 (NH 2, also known as Durgapur Expressway) and 17-18 Bus Route. This village is 6 km from Singur. The nearest railway station of Maheswarpur is Dhaniakhali, via Howrah-Burdwan chord line and the nearest Howrah-Burdwan main line station is Chinsurah.

Geography
It is situated on the Ganges delta. This village is rectangle shaped, bounded by some neighbor villages like Jampur, Hodla, Kharsat, Gondopur. A river has crossed on south-west of Maheswarpur.

References

Villages in Hooghly district